Lorenzo Moretti (born 26 February 2002) is an Italian professional footballer who plays as a defender for  club Avellino.

Club career
On 18 August 2021, Moretti was loaned to Serie C club Pistoiese.

On 15 July 2022, Moretti signed a three-year contract with Avellino.

Career statistics

Club

References

External links

2002 births
Living people
Italian footballers
Association football defenders
Serie C players
Inter Milan players
U.S. Pistoiese 1921 players
U.S. Avellino 1912 players
Italy youth international footballers